The list of Crusades in Europe and to the Holy Land identifies those conflicts in the 11th through 16th centuries that are referred to as Crusades. These include the traditional numbered crusades and others that prominent historians have identified as crusades. The scope of the term "crusade" is defined by French historian Louis R. Bréhier, writing in the Catholic Encyclopedia.

This list first discusses the traditional numbered crusades, with the various lesser-known crusades interspersed. The later crusades in the Levant through the 16th century are then listed. This is followed by lists of the crusades against the Byzantine empire, crusades that may have been pilgrimages, popular crusades, crusades against heretics and schismatics, political crusades, the Northern Crusades, crusades in the Iberian peninsula, Italian crusades and planned crusades that were never executed. Comprehensive studies of the Crusades in toto include Murray's Encyclopedia, Stephen Runciman's A History of the Crusades, 3 volumes (1951–1954), and the Wisconsin Collaborative History of the Crusades, 6 volumes (1969-1989).

Crusades to the Holy Land (1095–1291)

The conflicts that are usually associated with crusades in the Holy Land begin with the Council of Clermont in 1095 and end with the loss of Acre in 1291. These include the numbered Crusades (First through Eighth or Ninth) with numerous smaller crusades intermixed. One of the first to view the Crusades as a movement was English historian Thomas Fuller (1608–1661), whose Historie of the Holy Warre (1639) identified crusades as the Holy War consisting of "Voyages," numbering One through Thirteen, plus a Last Voyage and two additional Holy Wars. These Voyages include the First through Eighth Crusades in current numbering. Shortly thereafter, French Jesuit Louis Maimbourg (1610–1686) published his Histoire des Croisades pour la délivrance de la Terre Sainte (1675), identify the First through Fifth Crusades. In his work The Crusades—An Encyclopedia, historian Alan V. Murray further explains the traditional numbering of crusades:

The list of the Crusades to the Holy Land from 1095 through 1291 is as follows.

First Crusade. The First Crusade (1095–1099) refers to the activities from the Council of Clermont of 1095 through the establishment of the Kingdom of Jerusalem and the battle of Ascalon in 1099. Sometimes segregated into the People's Crusade and the Princes' Crusade. Some accounts also include the Crusade of 1101 here. The original chroniclers of the First Crusade did not, of course, refer to at such, or even as a crusade (as noted above). In the twelve Latin chronicles, the event is called, for example, the Deeds of the Franks or the Expedition to Jerusalem. Anna Komnene simply notes the arrival of the various armies in Constantinople, and Arabic historian ibn Athir calls it the Coming of the Franks. Thomas Fuller referred to it as Voyage 1 of the Holy Warre. It is unclear as to who first used the term, but it has been credited to Louis Maimbourg in his 1675 Histoire des Croisades. The term was certainly in common use by the 18th century as seen in Voltaire's Histoire des Croisades (1750–1751) and Edward Gibbon's History of the Decline and Fall of the Roman Empire (1776–1789). Thomas Asbridge's The First Crusade: A New History (2004) is among the standard references used today.

People's Crusade. The People's Crusade (1096) was a prelude to the First Crusade led by Peter the Hermit, the first of what is known as the Popular Crusades. It is sometimes regarded as an integral part of the First Crusade, with the Princes' Crusade as the second part. A standard reference is Peter der Eremite. Ein kritischer Beitrag zur Geschichte des ersten Kreuzzuges (1879) by pioneering German historian Heinrich Hagenmeyer (1834–1915). Peter and his crusade achieved a popular status in the 19th century through such works as Heroes of the Crusades (1869) by Barbara Hutton. The references shown above for the First Crusade generally cover the People's Crusade as well.

Crusade of 1101. The Crusade of 1101 (1101–1102) was also called the Crusade of the Faint-Hearted. Campaigns that followed the capture of Jerusalem in 1099 that were generally ignored by 18th and 19th century historians. Thomas Fuller nevertheless referred to it as Voyage 2 of the Holy Warre whereas Jonathan Riley-Smith considered it part of the First Crusade in his The First Crusaders, 1095-1131 (1997).

Norwegian Crusade. The Norwegian Crusade (1107–1110), also known as the Crusade of Sigurd Jorsalfar, king of Norway. More of a pilgrimage than a crusade, it did include the participation in military action, with the king's forces participation in the siege of Sidon. This crusade marks the first time a European king visited the Holy Land. This crusade is described in Heimskringla by Icelandic historian Snorri Sturluson.

Venetian Crusade. The Venetian Crusade (1122–1124), also known as the Crusade of Calixtus II. The Western participants from the Republic of Venice were regarded by Riley-Smith as First Crusaders, and the actions resulted in the capture of Tyre from the Damascene atabeg Toghtekin. This marked a major victor for Baldwin II of Jerusalem prior to his second captivity in 1123.

Crusade of 1129. The Crusade of 1129, also known as the Damascus Crusade, was begun by Baldwin II of Jerusalem after his captivity. The crusade failed in its objective to capture Damascus and is described by Syriac historian Michael the Syrian in his Chronicle (after 1195).

Second Crusade. The Second Crusade (1147–1150). After the disastrous siege of Edessa in 1144, the Western powers launched the Second Crusade, which accomplished little. Principal chroniclers of the event were Odo of Deuil, chaplin to Louis VII of France, who wrote his account De profectione Ludovici VII in Orientem and Otto of Freising who wrote Gesta Friderici imperatoris concerning the emperor Frederick Barbarosso. Referred to as the Second Crusade in Maimbourg's Histoire des Croisades... as well as Georg Müller's De Expedition Cruciatis Vulgo Von Kreutz Fahrten (1709). Thomas Fuller referred to it as Voyage 3 of the Holy Warre. The Wendish Crusade of 1147 (one of the Northern Crusades) is usually associated with the Second Crusade.

Crusader invasions of Egypt. The Crusader Invasions of Egypt (1154–1169) were attacks into Egypt by Amalric I of Jerusalem to take advantage of crises concerning the Fatimids. These activities eventually led to the fall of the Fatimids and the rise of Saladin and the Ayyubid dynasty.

Crusade to the East of Philip of Flanders. The Crusade to the East (1177) was a crusade led by Philip I, Count of Flanders that intended to invade Egypt, instead only mounting an unsuccessful siege of Harim.

Third Crusade. The Third Crusade (1189–1192). The Third Crusade was in response to the loss of Jerusalem to Saladin in 1187 and had significant English participation, under Richard I of England, as well as by the emperor Frederick Barbarossa and Philip II of France. To the English, it was known as the Itinerarium Regis Ricardi, the Itinerary of king Richard, and to the Germans as the expedition of Frederick, as described in Historia Peregrinorum (History of the Pilgrims). Thomas Andrew Archer's The Crusade of Richard I, 1189–1192 (1889) provides a comprehensive look at the crusade and its sources. Thomas Fuller referred to Frederick's portion as Voyage 4 of the Holy Warre, and Richard's portion as Voyage 5. The numbering of this crusade followed the same history as the first ones, with English histories such as David Hume's The History of England (1754–1761) and Charles Mills' History of the Crusades for the Recovery and Possession of the Holy Land (1820) identifying it as the Third Crusade. The former only considers the follow-on crusades to the extent that England participated.

Crusade of Emperor Henry VI. The Crusade of Henry VI (1197–1198) was also known as the Crusade of 1197 or the German Crusade. A crusade led by Holy Roman Emperor Henry VI as a follow-up to the Third Crusade. Although Henry died before the crusade began, it was modestly successful with the recapture of Beirut. Thomas Fuller referred to it as Voyage 6 of the Holy Warre.

Fourth Crusade. The Fourth Crusade (1202–1204) was also known as the Unholy Crusade. A major component of the crusade was against the Byzantine empire. Thomas Fuller referred to it as Voyage 7 of the Holy Warre. Charles du Cange, wrote the first serious study of the Fourth Crusade in his Histoire de l'empire de Constantinople sous les empereurs françois (1657). Geoffrey of Villehardouin was a knight and historian who wrote his eyewitness account De la Conquête de Constantinople (c. 1215) of the crusade and its aftermath. Voltaire did not call it a crusade in his Histoire des Croisades, instead calling it the Suite de la Prise de Constantinople par les Croisés. Jonathan Philips' The Fourth Crusade and the Sack of Constantinople (2004) is a standard reference today.

Fifth Crusade. The Fifth Crusade (1217–1221) was a failed attempt to recapture Jerusalem by first conquering Cairo. Critical original sources include Historia Damiatina by Oliver of Paderborn (died 1227) and Chronica Hungarorum by Joannes de Thurocz, compiled in the collection Gesta Dei per Francos (God's Work through the Franks) (1611) by Jacques Bongars. A standard reference is Reinhold Röhricht's Studien zur Geschichte des fünften Kreuzzuges (1891). Thomas Fuller referred to it as Voyage 8 of the Holy Warre.

Sixth Crusade. The Sixth Crusade (1228–1229), was also known as the Crusade of Emperor Frederick II. Sometimes regarded as part of the Fifth Crusade, it was an extension of that activity that involved little fighting. Jerusalem was nevertheless returned to Western hands by negotiation. Original sources include Chronica Majora (1259) by Matthew Paris and Flores Historiarum (1235) by Roger of Wendover, with Arabic sources that include Abu'l-Feda's Tarikh al-Mukhtasar fi Akhbar al-Bashar (1329). Modern histories include Röhricht's Die Kreuzfahrt Kaiser Friedrich des Zweiten (1228–1229) (1872). Referred to it as Voyage 9 of the Holy Warre by Thomas Fuller in his 1639 Historie. See also references under the Crusade against Frederick II (1220–1241) below.

Barons' Crusade. Barons' Crusade (1239–1241) was also referred to as the Crusade of 1239, or the Crusade of Theobald I of Navarre and the Crusade of Richard of Cornwall. Called for in 1234 by Gregory IX in his papal bull Rachel suum videns. Successful expeditions to recaptured portions of the Holy Land. First treated by R. Röhricht in his Die Kreuzzuge des Grafen Theobald von Navarra und Richard von Cornwallis nach dem heligen Landen. Thomas Fuller referred to it as Voyages 10 and 11 of the Holy Warre.

Crusade of Theobald I of Navarre. The Crusade of Theobald I of Navarre (1239–1240) was a crusade led by Theobald I of Navarre, also referred to as Thibaut of Navarre or Theobald of Champagne. Part of the Barons' Crusade, 1239–1241. Among modern historians, René Grousset was among the first to discuss this crusade in his Histoire des croisades et du royaume franc de Jérusalem (1934-1936) Thomas Fuller referred to it as Voyage 10 of the Holy Warre.

Crusade of Richard of Cornwall. The Crusade of Richard of Cornwall (1240–1241) was also known as the Crusade of Richard of Cornwall and Simon of Montfort to Jaffa. Richard also held the title King of the Romans, and had a noteworthy biography written by Noël Denholm-Young. Usually referred to as part of the Barons' Crusade, 1239–1241. Thomas Fuller referred to it as Voyage 11 of the Holy Warre.

Crusade to Tzurulum. The Crusade to Tzurulum (1239) led by future Latin emperor Baldwin of Courtenay was conducted concurrently with the Barons' Crusade. In the military action, Baldwin besieged and captured Tzurulum, a Nicaean stronghold west of Constantinople.

Crusade against the Mongols. The Crusade against the Mongols (1241) was led by Conrad IV of Germany and is also known as the Anti-Mongol Crusade of 1241. British historian Peter Jackson documented this crusade in his study Crusade against the Mongols (1241).

Seventh Crusade. The Seventh Crusade (1248–1254) os also known as the Crusade of Louis IX of France to the East, or Louis IX's First Crusade. Early works on this crusade include Primat of Saint-Denis' Roman des rois (1274) and Jean de Joinville's Life of Saint Louis (1309). Thomas Fuller referred to it as Voyage 12 of the Holy Warre. Grousset's Histoire des croisades... and Peter Jackson's Seventh Crusade, 1244–1254: Sources and Documents (2007) provide the necessary historical background.

Crusade of Odo of Burgundy. The Crusade of Odo of Burgundy (1265–1266) was an expedition of Odo, Count of Nevers, who led 50 knights to protect Acre from Mamluk sultan Baibars.

Crusade of 1267. The Crusade of 1267 was an expedition from the Upper Rhine to counter the threat posed by Baibars.

Crusade of Charles of Anjou. The Crusade of Charles of Anjou against Lucera (1268) refers to the attack made by Charles I of Anjou on the Muslims at Lucera in conjunction with the Crusade against Conradin of 1268 (cf. Italian Crusades below).

Crusade of James I of Aragon. The Crusade of James I of Aragon (1269–1270). James I of Aragon joined forces with Abaqa, Mongol ruler of the Ilkhanate, to take a crusade to the Holy Land, but returned without engaging the Mamluks in light of their strength at Acre.

Eighth Crusade. The Eighth Crusade (1270) was also known as the Crusade of Louis IX of France to Tunis. Accompanied by Jean de Joinville who wrote the biography Life of Saint Louis (1309). Thomas Fuller referred to it as Voyage 31 of the Holy Warre.

Lord Edward's Crusade. Lord Edward's Crusade (1271–1272) was led by the future Edward I of England, and is also known as the Crusade of Lord Edward of England, the Ninth Crusade, or the Last Crusade. It is regarded by some as an extension of the Eighth Crusade. Edward, later King of England, was accompanied by his wife Eleanor of Castile, who came to his aid after an assassination attempt. Discussed as part of the Eighth Crusade by Joseph François Michaud in Volume 3 of his seminal Histoire des Croisades (1812–1822).

Crusade of Henry of Mecklenburg. The Crusade of Henry of Mecklenburg (1275). Henry I, Lord of Mechlenburg (died 1302) went on a crusade or pilgrimage to the Holy Land c. 1275 and was captured by the Egyptians and held for 32 years. The only known reference to this is by Thomas Fuller in his Historie of the Holy Warre, where it is referred to as the Last Voyage.

Siege of Acre. The Siege of Acre (1291) marked the loss of the Holy Land to the Mamluks, typically identifying the end of the traditional Crusades. The anonymous Les Gestes des Chiprois (Deeds of the Cypriots) contains one of two eyewitness accounts of the siege.

Later Crusades (1291–1578) 
After the fall of Acre, the crusades continued in the Levant through the 16th century. Principal references on this subject are Kenneth Setton's History of the Crusades, Volume III. The Fourteenth and Fifteen Centuries (1975), and Norman Housley's The Later Crusades, 1274-1580: From Lyons to Alcazar (1992) and The Crusading Movement, 1274–1700 (1995). Barbara Tuchman's A Distant Mirror: The Calamitous 14th Century (1978) provides an interesting perspective on both the crusades and the general history of the era. A nineteenth-century reference often cited is Joseph François Michaud's Histoire des Croisades (1812–1822), translation by William Robson.

Crusade against Frederick III. The Crusade against Frederick III of Sicily (1298, 1299, 1302). The final round of the War of the Sicilian Vespers in which pope Boniface VIII attempted to dislodge Frederick. Frederick's position was solidified by the Peace of Caltabellotta in 1302, after which the crusaders were unable to dislodge him.

Crusade against the Colonna Cardinals. The Crusade against the Colonna Cardinals (1298) was a crusade of Boniface VIII against the Colonna family.

Expedition of the Almogavars. The Expedition of the Almogavars (1301–1311) consisted of campaigns of the Catalan Company, formed by veterans of the War of the Sicilian Vespers (the Almogavar) against the Anatolian beyliks. It concluded with the Catalan's taking control of the Duchy of Athens and Thebes.

Hospitaller Crusade. The Hospitaller Crusade (1306–1310). A crusade known as the Hospitaller conquest of Rhodes that consolidated hold of the Knights Hospitaller on Rhodes. Documented by Hans Prutz in his Die Anfänge der Hospitaliter auf Rhodos, 1310–1355 (1908).

Crusade against the Catalan Grand Company. The Crusade against the Catalan Grand Company (1330–1332) was also called the Anti-Catalan Crusade, waged by Walter VI, Count of Brienne, and titular Duke of Athens. In 1330, John XXII issued a papal bull and ordered prelates in Italy and Greece to preach for a crusade against the Catalan Grand Company. Shortly thereafter,  Robert of Naples gave the crusade his support. The Venetians, however, renewed their treaty with the Catalans in 1331. By the summer, it was clear that the expedition had failed, and Walter returned to Brindisi, saddled with crippling debts.

The Naval Crusade of the Holy League. The Naval Crusade of the Holy League (1332–1333) was short-lived crusade against the Aydinid Turkish fleet by Pietro Zeno, serving as balio of Negroponte. In 1332, a Turkish armada under Umur Bey attacked Negroponte, and Zeno bought them off with a large tribute. Zeno and Pietro da Canale were accused by Francesco Dandolo with arranging an anti-Turkish alliance. By the end of the year the Holy League (also known as the Naval League) "a union, society and league for the discomfiture of the Turks and the defence of the true faith", had been formally constituted. In 1334, Zeno took command of the league's fleet and defeated the fleet of the Beylik of Karasi at the battle of Adramyttion. Zeno later served as one of the leaders of the Smyrna Crusade of 1344.

The Holy League of Clement VI. The Holy League of Clement VI (1343) was a crusade proclaimed by Clement VI in 1343 that resulted in a naval attack on Smyrna the next year. The Grand Counci of Venice elected Pietro Zeno as captain of the flotilla sent to assist the crusade against Aydinid-held Smyrna. Other crusader leaders included patriarch Henry of Asti, The crusade was a naval success and Smyrna was taken. Zeno was killed by Umur Bey's forces in an ambush while he and other crusaderswere attempting to celebrate mass in the no-man's-land between the battle lines.

Smyrna Crusade. The Smyrna Crusade (1344) was the first of the Smyrniote Crusades (1343–1351). The Smyrna Crusade began in 1344 with the naval victory of the battle of Pallene and ended with an assault on Smyrna, capturing the harbour and the citadel but not the acropolis. Sometimes considered as part of the Holy League of Clement VI.

Crusade of Humbert II of Viennois. The Crusade of Humbert II of Viennois (1346) was the second of the Smyrniote Crusades. A second expedition under the command of Humbert II of Viennois with little to show other than a victory over the Turks at Mytilene. Described in the Book of Chivalry by Geoffroi de Charny. Also called the Second Smyrna Crusade.

Crusade against Francesco Ordelaffi. The Crusade against Francesco Ordelaffi (1355–1357) was a campaign by Innocent IV and Cardinal Gil Álvarez Carrillo de Albornoz against Francesco II Ordelaffi in order to restore papal authority to central Italy. The pope's Angevin troops had some success against Ordelaffi through 1356, by mercenary troops sent by Bernabò Visconti allowed him to hold out until 1357.

Crusade of Peter I de Lusignan. The Crusade of Peter I de Lusignan (1362–1365). Peter I of Cyprus (Peter I de Lusignan) was King of Cyprus and titular King of Jerusalem. He founded the chivalric Order of the Sword in 1347, dedicated to the recovery of Jerusalem, and attempted to convince nobles in Europe to mount a new crusade. His efforts were eventually merged with the Alexandrian Crusade.

Alexandrian Crusade. The Alexandrian Crusade (1365). An attack by Peter I of Cyprus that resulted in the destruction of Alexandria, but had little real impact. Accounts of the crusade was given by Guillaume de Machaut in his La Prise d'Alexandre (after 1369) and by Muslim historian al-Nuwayrī in his Kitāb al-Ilmām (1365–1374).

Crusade of Amadeus VI. The Crusade of Amadeus VI of Savoy or Savoyard crusade (1366–1367). Amadeus VI of Savoy (Amadeo), known as the Green Count of Savoy, launched a minor crusade against Thrace and Bulgaria. He attacked Ottoman sultan Murad I with 15 ships and 1,700 men in 1366 in order  to aid his cousin, John V Palaiologos. Recounted by Romanian historian Nicolae Iorga in his work about French knight Philippe de Mézières (c. 1327 – 1405) and Eugene L. Cox's Green Count of Savoy (1967).

The Great Schism and the Crusades. The Great Schism and the Crusades (1382–1387). The Great (or Western) Schism within the Catholic Church from 1378–1417 led to a number of minor crusades included that against Charles III of Naples (1382); the Despenser's Crusade (1383); and the crusade of John of Gaunt (1387). The work by Walter Ullmann on the subject is a standard reference.

Crusade against Charles III. The Crusade against Charles III of Naples (1382). Charles Durazzo became Charles III as king of Naples and titular king of Jerusalem after having his cousin Joanna I of Naples strangled in jail. In 1382 Clement VII granted crusade indulgences to Louis I of Anjou and others to dethrone Charles. A crusade associated with the Great Schism.

Despenser's Crusade. Despenser's Crusade (1383), also known as the Norwich Crusade, was a military expedition led by Henry le Despenser in order to assist Ghent in its struggle against the supporters of antipope Clement VII. A crusade associated with the Great Schism.

Crusade of John of Gaunt. The Crusade of John of Gaunt (1387). John of Gaunt led an unsuccessful crusade against Henry of Trastámara to claim the throne of Castile by right of his wife Constance of Castile. A crusade associated with the Great Schism.

Mahdia Crusade. The Mahdia Crusade (1390), also known as the Barbary Crusade or the Crusade of Louis II de Bourbon against Mahdia, was a Franco-Genoese military expedition in 1390 that led to the siege of Mahdia, a stronghold of the Barbary pirates. A work by Belgian court historian Jean Froissart called the Chronicles of England, France, and the Adjoining Countries (c. 1400), referred to as Froissart's Chronicles, includes an account of this crusade.

Crusade of Nicopolis. The Crusade of Nicopolis (1396), also known as the Battle of Nicopolis or the Crusade to Nicopolis. The crusader army of Hungarian, Croatian, Bulgarian, French and German force (assisted by the Venetian navy) was defeated by the Ottoman's at the Danubian fortress of Nicopolis, leading to the end of the Second Bulgarian Empire.

Crusade of Marshal Boucicaut. The Crusade of Marshal Boucicaut to Constantinople (1399). In 1399, Boniface IX preached a crusade to Constantinople, and Jean II Le Maingre (Boucicaut) was the only respondent. His one-man crusade consisted of raids on Turkish towns along the Black Sea coast.

Crusade of Varna. The Crusade of Varna (1443–1444), also known as the Crusade to Varna, was an unsuccessful military campaign by the European monarchies to check the expansion of the Ottoman empire into Central Europe. The crusade was called by Eugene IV and led by Władysław III of Poland, John Hunyadi of Hungary, Voivode of Transylvania, and Philip the Good, duke of Burgundy. The aftermath left the Ottomans free from further attempts to push it out of Europe.

Crusades to Recover Constantinople. Crusades to Recover Constantinople (1453–1460). New crusades called for after the loss of Constantinople to the Ottomans in 1453. Includes the Crusade of Nicholas V (later, Callixtus III) and the unrealizeded Crusade of Pius II.

Crusade of Nicholas V. The Crusade of Nicholas V (1455–1456). After the fall of Constantinople to the Ottomans in 1453, pope Nicholas V planned a small crusade to recapture the city, reconfirmed by Callixtus III after Nicholas' death. Only John Hunyadi responded, defeating the Turks at Belgrade in 1456 before his untimely death. See Crusade of St. John of Capistrano (1456).

Genoese Crusade to defend Chios. The Genoese Crusade to defend Chios (1455–1457) began after Mehmed II declared war on Chios and Rhodes, and a Genoese fleet was dispatched to defend the island.

Crusade of St. John of Capistrano. The Crusade of St. John of Capistrano (1456), also known as the Siege of Belgrade of 1456, began after the fall of Constantinople in 1453 when Mehmet II set his sights on the Kingdom of Hungary. The Ottoman forces were defeated by an army led by Catholic priest John of Capistrano and John Hunyadi. Crusade of Nicholas V (1455–1456).

Occupation of Sporades. The Occupation of Sporades (1457). Occupation of the northern Sporades islands by papal galleys.

Siege of Rhodes. The Siege of Rhodes (1480). In 1480, an Ottoman fleet unsuccessfully began the siege of Rhodes. The Ottoman army under the command of Mesih Pasha was defeated by the Knights Hospitaller garrison led by Pierre d'Aubusson. Gulielmus Caoursin, vice-chancellor of the Hospitaller, was also an eye-witness to the siege.

The Anti-Turkish Crusade. The Anti-Turkish Crusade (1480–1481) was a crusade of pope Sixtus IV against Mehmet II to protect southern Italy. Primarily consisted of the Crusade of Otranto.

Crusade of Otranto. The Crusade of Otranto (1481) was acrusade to recapture the city after the Ottoman invasion of Otranto. The citizens, killed by the Ottomans for refusing to convert to Islam, are known as the martyrs of Otranto. Part of the Anti-Turkish Crusade of Sixtus IV.

Spanish Crusade in North Africa. The Spanish Crusade in North Africa (1499–1510). Following the end of Muslim rule in Hispania, a number of cities were recaptured including: Melilla (1497), Mers el-Kebir (1505), Canary Islands (1508), Oran (1509), Rock of Algiers, Bougie and Tripoli (1510).

Siege of Rhodes. The siege of Rhodes (1522) was the second and ultimately successful attempt by the Ottoman empire to expel the Knights Hospitaller from their island stronghold of Rhodes.

Crusade of the Emperor Charles V to Tunis. The Crusade of the Emperor Charles V to Tunis (1535) was also known as the Conquest of Tunis. In 1535, Tunis, then under the control of the Ottoman empire, was captured by emperor Charles V and his allies.

Crusade of the Emperor Charles V to Algiers. The Crusade of the Emperor Charles V to Algiers (1541), also known as the Algiers Expedition, was an unsuccessful attempt to dislodge to Ottomans from Algiers.

Spanish Crusade to Mahdia. The Spanish Crusade to Mahdia (1550), also known as the Capture of Mahdia. A Spanish naval expedition supported by the Knights of Malta under Claude de la Sengle, besieged and captured the Ottoman stronghold of Mahdia. Mahdia was abandoned by Spain three years later, with its fortifications demolished to avoid reoccupation of the city.

Crusade of King Sebastian. The Crusade of King Sebastian of Portugal to Morocco (1578) was also known as the Battle of Alcácer Quibir or the Battle of Three Kings. The battle was between the army of deposed Moroccan sultan Abu Abdallah Mohammed II allied with Sebastian I of Portugal, against a large Moroccan army under the new sultan Abd Al-Malik I who was allied with the Ottomans. Al-Malik and the Ottomans won a decisive victory.

Crusades against the Byzantine Empire
Crusades against the Byzantine empire began shortly after the First Crusade and continued throughout its existence. These include the following.

Crusade of Bohemond of Taranto. The Crusade of Bohemond of Taranto (1107–1108), also known as Bohemond's Crusade. A campaign led by Bohemond of Taranto against the Byzantine empire that ended with the Treaty of Devol.

Crusading Project against Byzantium. The Crusading Project against Byzantium (1149–1150) was an effort by Roger II of Sicily and Louis VII of France to aid the East and exact revenge on the Greeks after the Second Crusade.

Fourth Crusade. The Fourth Crusade (1202–1204), also known as the Unholy Crusade. See details above.

Crusade against the Bulgars. The Crusade against the Bulgars (1205) was a call for a crusade against Kaloyan, king of the Bulgarians, by Renier of Trit, duke of Philippopolis. Their offense was that they had aligned themselves with enemies of the Cross of Christ, the Bogomils and Paulicians. Nothing came of the request. This and other aspects of the eastern Byzantine commonwealth were exhaustively studied by contemporary Russian historian Dimitri Obolensky.

Crusade of William VI of Montferrat. The Crusade of William VI of Montferrat (1225). A minor crusade of William VI of Montferrat to support his claims to the throne of Thessalonica (rarely mentioned).

Anti-Byzantine Crusades. The Anti-Byzantine Crusades (1261–1320) included three attempts to regain the Byzantine empire from the Palaiologos dynasty. The loss of Constantinople in 1261 happened during a papal interregnum, and the next year the newly-seated Urban IV authorized a crusade to retake the city. Nothing beyond the defeat of the Byzantines at the naval battle of Settepozzi in 1263. Urban IV renewed his call for crusade in 1264, for the succor of the Morea, but to no avail. In 1281, Charles I of Anjou, Philip of Courtenay and the Venetians planned an incursion into the Byzantine Empire for the recapture of Constantinople. This was blessed by Martin IV, labeling it a crusade. This was thwarted by the war of the Sicilian Vespers. After the Peace of Caltabellotta, the final anti-Byzantine crusade was hatched. Charles of Valois, the husband of Catherine of Courtenay, titular Latin empress of Constantinople, sought to use the Catalan Grand Company to advance his goals, but the company proved unable to effectively organize.

Crusades also referred to as pilgrimages
Some pilgrimages are referred to as crusades, especially if the journey resulted in some military activity. Some examples include the following.

Norwegian Crusade. The Norwegian Crusade (1107–1110), also known as the Crusade of Sigurd Jorsalfar. See above.

Crusade or Pilgrimage of Fulk V of Anjou. The Crusade or Pilgrimage of Fulk V of Anjou (1120–1122). The future king of Jerusalem traveled to the Holy Land and joined the Knights Templar, according to Ordoric Vitalis' Historia Ecclesiastica (c. 1141).

Pilgrimage of Rognvald Kali Kolsson. The Pilgrimage of Rognvald Kali Kolsson (1151–1153) was also known as the Crusade of Rognvald Kali Kolsson. In 1151, Rognvald set out on a pilgrimage to the Holy Land as described in the Orkneyinga saga. The earl's party left Orkney in the late summer of 1151 in fifteen ships, with six sailing to Jerusalem while Rognvald stoppeded in Narbonne. After visiting Jerusalem, the party returned via Constantinople, where they were received by the emperor, then sailed to Apulia where they took horses for the journey to Rome, arriving back in Orkney in time for Christmas 1153.

Crusade or Pilgrimage of Henry the Lion. The Crusade or Pilgrimage of Henry the Lion (1172). A pilgrimage to Jerusalem documented by Arnold of Lübeck in his Chronicae Slavorum (1209), often referred to as a crusade.

Crusade of Henry of Mecklenburg. The Crusade of Henry of Mecklenburg (1275). Henry I, Lord of Mechlenburg (died 1302) went on a crusade or pilgrimage to the Holy Land c. 1275 and was captured by the Egyptians and held for 32 years. The only know reference to this is by Thomas Fuller in his Historie of the Holy Warre, where it is referred to as the Last Voyage.

Popular Crusades

The Popular Crusades were generated by enthusiasm for crusading, but unsanctioned by the Church.

People's Crusade. The People's Crusade (1096). A prelude to the First Crusade led by Peter the Hermit. See above.

Children's Crusade. The Children's Crusade (1212) was a failed Popular Crusade by the West to regain the Holy Land. The traditional narrative includes some factual and some mythical events including visions by a French boy and a German boy, an intention to peacefully convert Muslims to Christianity, bands of children marching to Italy, and children being sold into slavery. Thomas Fuller referred to it as a Holy war in his Historie of the Holy Warre.

First Shepherds' Crusade. The First Shepherds’ Crusade (1251) was a popular crusade also known as the Crusade of the Pastoreaux. The movement was aimed at rescuing Louis IX during his imprisonment during the Seventh Crusade. The group was dispersed in Paris.

Crusade of the Poor. The Crusade of the Poor (1309) was also known as the Crusade of 1309 or the Shepards' Crusade of 1309. A popular crusade that began with the unfulfilled Crusade of Clement V (see below).

Second Shepherds' Crusade. The Second Shepherds' Crusade (1320), also known as the Pastoreaux of 1320, it was the last of the popular crusades.

Crusades against Christians
The Crusades against Christians, including heretics and schismatics, include the following.

Albigensian Crusade. The Albigensian Crusade (1209–1229), or Cathar Crusade, was the first of the so-called religious crusades and was conducted against the Cathars in southern France. The 20-year campaign was successful. One of the first actions, the massacre at Béziers, helped earn the crusade the title as "one of the most conclusive cases of genocide in religious history." After the military phase, the inquisition conducted by Gregory IX in 1234 all but eliminated the Cathars. Contemporaneous chronicles of the crusade include Peter of Vaux de Cernay's Historia Albigensis and Guillaume de Puylaurens' Cronica, both of which appear Guizot's Collection des mémoires relatifs à l'histoire de France (1823–1835). Thomas Fuller referred to it as a Holy war in his Historie of the Holy Warre (1639).

Bogomils Crusades. The Bogomils Crusades (1234, 1252) were crusades against the Bogomils were called for in 1234 by Gregory IX and in 1252 by Innocent IV.

Crusades against the Bosnian Heritics. The Crusades against the Bosnian Heritics (1235, 1241), also known as the Bosnian Crusades. Fought against unspecified "heretics," the action was essentially a war of conquest by Hungarian prince Coloman of Galicia against the Banate of Bosnia, sanctioned as a crusade by Gregory IX. The would-be crusaders only succeeded in conquering peripheral parts of the country.

Despenser's Crusade. Despenser's Crusade (1383), also known as the Norwich Crusade, was a military expedition led by Henry le Despenser in order to assist Ghent in its struggle against the supporters of antipope Clement VII. A crusade associated with the Great Schism.

Crusades against the Hussites. The Crusades against the Hussites (1420–1431). The five crusades from the Hussite Wars known as the Anti-Hussite Crusades.

First Anti-Hussite Crusade. The First Anti-Hussite Crusade (1420). Pope Martin V issued a bull in 1420 proclaiming a crusade "for the destruction of the Wycliffites, Hussites and all other heretics in Bohemia". Holy Roman Emperor Sigismund and many German princes laid siege to Prague with an army of crusaders from all parts of Europe, largely consisting of adventurers attracted by the hope of pillage. Sigismund was defeated that same year at the battle of Vítkov Hill.

Second Anti-Hussite Crusade. The Second Anti-Hussite Crusade (1421–1422). After the Hussite victory in 1420, a priest named Jan Želivský obtained authority over Prague. In 1421, a new crusade against the Hussites was undertaken, laying siege to the town of Žatec. Sigismund arrived in Bohemia at the end of 1421, but was decisively defeated at the battle of Deutschbrod in 1422.

Third Anti-Hussite Crusade. The Third Anti-Hussite Crusade (1423–1424). The pope called a new crusade against Bohemia, but it was a complete failure. Poles and Lithuanians did not wish to attack the  Czechs, the Germans were hampered by internal discord, and Eric VII of Denmark, intending to take part in the crusade, soon returned to Scandinavia. Sigismund Korybut, governor of Bohemia, helped broker the peace in 1424.

Fourth Anti-Hussite Crusade. The Fourth Anti-Hussite Crusade (1426–1428). In 1426, the Hussites were attacked again by foreign forces. Hussite forces, led by Sigismund Korybut and Prokop the Great, defeated the invaders in the battle of Aussig of 1426. Despite this, the pope believed that the Hussites were weakened and proclaimed a fourth crusade in 1427. Cardinal Henry Beaufort was appointed leader of the crusader forces. The crusaders were defeated at the battle of Tachov that same year. Korybut was imprisoned in 1427 for conspiring to surrender Hussite forces to the emperor Sigismund. He was released in 1428, and participated in the Hussite invasion of Silesia.

Fifth Anti-Hussite Crusade. The Fifth Anti-Hussite Crusade (1431). In 1431, Frederick I, Elector of Brandenburg and papal legate cardinal Julian Cesarini led a crusader army against Bohemia. The defending army led by Prokop the Great, supplemented by Polish Hussites, defeated the crusaders at the battle of Domažlice that same year.

Waldensian Crusade in the Dauphine. The Waldensian Crusade in the Dauphine (1487–1491) was a crusade against the Waldensians (Vaudois), a sect regarded as heretics, beginning with the burning at the stake of 80 Waldensians in 1211. In 1487, Innocent VIII issued a bull for the extermination of the heresies of the Vaudois. Alberto de' Capitanei organized a crusade and launched an offensive against the Vaudois in Dauphiné and Piedmont. Charles I, Duke of Savoy, intervened in order to save his territories from further turmoil and promised the Vaudois peace, which did not occur before the offensive had devastated the area. Angelo Carletti di Chivasso brought about a peaceful agreement between the parties, which was short-lived as attested by the Mérindol massacre of 1545, with persecution continuing until after the French Revolution.

Political Crusades
Political crusades include the following.

Political Crusade against Roger II of Sicily. The Political Crusade against Roger II of Sicily (1127–1135). Called the First Political Crusade, it began in 1127 when Honorius II, suspicious of the growth of Norman power in southern Italy, and at Capua in December, the pope preached a crusade against Roger II of Sicily. Upon the death of Honorius in 1130, Anacletus II and Innocent II were both claimants to the papal throne. Roger supported the antipope Anacletus. In 1135, Innocent II offered Crusader indulgences to those who fought his enemies. There is no evidence that any military action was taken, but the action is viewed as a harbinger for the political crusades of the 13th century.

Crusade against Markward von Anweiler. The Crusade against Markward von Anweiler (1199). The second of the so-called political crusades, that the papacy regarded as a pre-condition to a fourth crusade. In 1199, Innocent III declared a crusade against Markward von Anweiler, Imperial seneschal and regent of the Kingdom of Sicily, who opposed papal claims on the regency of Sicily. Markward was regarded by Innocent as "worse than the infidels," granting those few who fought against him crusader indulgences. Among those taking arms was Walter III of Brienne who wished to secure his claim to Taranto by virtue of his marriage to Elvira of Sicily. The need for the crusade ended with Markward's death in 1202.

Papal Quarrel with John Lackland. Papal Quarrel with John Lackland (1208). The conflict between John of England and Innocent III that led to John's excommunication has been referred to as a crusade.

A Political Crusade in England. A Political Crusade in England (1215–1217). Two crusades were declared by Henry III of England against his rebellious subjects. The first began with a French knight Savari de Mauléon who had been in service to Hemry's predecessor, John of England, in the First Barons' War. The pope, Innocent III, had described Savari as crucesignatus pro defense Regni Anglie, setting the stage for Henry to take the cross, with the inherent protections from Rome.  The conflict was finally settled in 1217 with the Treaty of Lambeth between Henry and Louis VIII of France.

Gregory IX's Crusade against Frederick II. The Crusade against Frederick II (1228–1230), also known as the War of the Keys. Efforts of pope Gregory IX against Frederick II. See also references under the Sixth Crusade above.

Crusade against the Stedinger. The Crusade against the Stedinger (1233–1234), also known as the Stedinger Crusade. The Stedinger were free farmers whose grievances over taxes and property rights turned into full-scale revolt. A papal-sanctioned  crusade was called against the rebels. In the campaign of 1233, the small crusading army was defeated. In a follow-up campaign of 1234, a much larger crusader army was victorious.

Innocent IV's Crusade against Frederick II. Pope Innocent IV's Crusade against Frederick II (1248). The conflict between the pope and the emperor began with the apostolic letter Ad apostolicae dignitatis apicem in 1245 and was not resolved until Frederick's death in 1250.

Crusade against Sicily, The Crusade against Sicily (1248). Actions taken by Innocent IV after Frederick II's defeat at the battle of Parma.

Crusade against Conrad IV. The Crusade against Conrad IV (1250). A crusade against Conrad IV of Germany that was a continuation of the crusade against his father Frederick II.

Another Political Crusade in England. Another Political Crusade in England (1263–1265). The second of Henry III's political crusades began with the Second Barons' War in 1263. Again a crusade was declared by Henry III of England against his enemies, with consent two papal legates to England. The death of Simon de Montfort in 1265 put an end to this rebellion.

Crusade against Frederico I of Montefeltro. The Crusade against Frederico I of Montefeltro (1321–1322) was a crusade proclaimed by John XXII in 1321 against Federico I, Count of Montefeltro (1296–1322), and his brothers to regain possession of the March of Ancona and Duchy of Spoleto. Malatesta da Verucchio, ruler of Rimini, supported by the commune of Perugia, killed Federico and captured his brothers in 1322.

Crusade against the Emperor Louis IV. The Crusade against the Emperor Louis IV (1328–1329) was a crusade against Louis IV, Holy Roman Emperor, also called the Crusade against Ludwig IV of Bavaria. Pope John XXII declared a crusade against Louis shortly after his coronation in 1328. Louis responded by installing an antipope, Nicholas V, declaring John deposed because of heresy. The crusade against Louis was renewed in 1329, and Robert of Naples sent forces against Louis and his ally Frederick II of Sicily but little came of it. Louis was also a protector of the Teutonic Knights, bestowing on the order a privilege to conquer Lithuania and Russia.

Northern Crusades

The Northern Crusades (1150–1560), also known as Baltic Crusades, occurred in northern Europe at the same time as the traditional crusades.

Wendish Crusade. The Wendish Crusade (1147) was the first of the Northern Crusades, usually associated with the Second Crusade. A military campaign by the Holy Roman Empire and directed against the Polabian Slavs, or Wends.

Swedish Crusades. The Swedish Crusades (1150s–1293) consisted of the First Swedish Crusade (1150s), likely fictional, the Second Swedish Crusade (13th century), and the Third Swedish Crusade (1293).

Drenthe Crusade. The Drenthe Crusade (1228–1232) was a papal-approved military campaign launched against Drenthe in 1228. The crusade was led by Willibrand, Bishop of Utrecht, commanding a Frisian army. Willibrand's crusade ended inconclusively in 1232.

Danish Crusades. The Danish Crusades (1191, 1293). The Danes made at least three crusades to Finland. The first is from 1187 when crusader Esbern Snare mentioned in his christmas feast speech a major victory from the Finns. Two next known crusades were made in 1191 and in 1202. The latter one was led by the Bishop of Lund, Anders Sunesen, with his brother. The Danes also participated in the Livonian Crusades.

Livonian Crusades. The Livonian Crusades (1193–1287) are the various Christianization campaigns in the area constituting modern Lithuania, Latvia and Estonia following the 1193 call of Celestine III for a crusade against pagans in Northern Europe. It was conducted mostly by Germans from the Holy Roman Empire and Danes, and consisted of four parts: Crusades against the Livonians (1198–1209); Conquest of the Estonian Hinderland (1208–1226); Crusades against the Oeselians (1206–1261); Crusade against Curonians (1242–1267); and, Crusade against Semigallians (1219–1290). The principal original sources on these crusades are the Livonian Rhymed Chronicle and the Livonian Chronicle of Henry.

Crusades against Livonians. The Crusades against Livonians (1198–1209). When peaceful means of conversion failed to convert the Livonians, bishop Berthold of Hanover arrived with a large contingent of crusaders in 1198. Berthold was surrounded soon after and killed, his forces defeated. To avenge Berthold's death, Innocent III then issued a bull declaring a crusade against the Livonians. Albert of Riga arrived the following year with a large force and in 1202, formed the Livonian Brothers of the Sword to aid in the conversion of the pagans. The Livonians led by Caupo of Turaida rebelled against the crusaders. Caupo's forces were defeated in 1206, and the Livonians were declared to be converted. Albert invaded with the forces of the Order in 1209, and the Livonians under duke Visvaldis were forced to submit to Albert.

Conquest of the Estonian Hinderland. Conquest of the Estonian Hinderland (1208–1226). The crusaders began operations against the Estonians in 1208, with the help of the newly converted Livonians. From 1208–1227, war parties rampaged through Estonia. A truce was established from 1213–1215, but the Estonians were unable to develop into a centralized state. They were led by Lembitu of Lehola who was killed along with Caupo of Turaida (fighting for the crusaders), at the 1217 battle of St. Matthew's Day, a crushing defeat for the Estonians. The Chronicle of Henry of Livonia relates how in 1226, papal legate William of Modena successfully mediated peace in the area.

Crusades against the Oeselians. The Crusades against the Oeselians (1206–1261). The Estonian region of Saaremaa, whose occupants were known as Oeselians, resisted the German crusaders, maintaining war fleets that continued to raid Denmark and Sweden. Danish armies led by Valdemar II of Denmark failed in Saaremaa in 1206 and 1222, as did John I of Sweden in 1220. The Livonian Brothers of the Sword finally succeeding in converting the Oeselians to Christianity in 1226 after failing in 1216. After regressing, the Oeselians once again accepted Christianity in 1241, and signed a treaty in 1255. Conflict returned in 1261 as the Oeselians once more renounced Christianity and killed all the occupying Germans. A  final peace treaty was imposed that year by the Livonian Order, a branch of the Teutonic Order.

Crusade against Curonians. The Crusade against Curonians (1242–1267). After the defeat of the Estonians in 1126 and the Oeselians in 1241, the crusade moved against the Curonians who had attacked Riga in 1210 and 1228. Those in the north accepted peace with the Germans in 1230, but in the south the fighting continued. In 1260, the Curonians fought alongside the crusaders in the battle of Durbe, abandoning them in the midst of battle, allowing the Lithuanians to gain victory over the Livonian Order and Teutonic Knights. The Curonians were finally subdued in 1267 and the land partitioned. This was documented by Peter of Dusburg in his 1326 work Chronicon terrae Prussiae.

Crusade against Semigallians. The Crusade against Semigallians (1219–1290). According to the Livonian Chronicle of Henry, the Semigallians formed an alliance with Albert of Riga against the Livonians before 1203, and received military support to hold back Lithuanian attacks in 1205. In 1219, this alliance was shattereded after a crusader invasion in Semigallia. Duke Viestards then formed an alliance with Lithuanians and Curonians. In 1228, Semigallians and Curonians attacked the main crusader stronghold, with the crusaders taking revenge and invaded Semigallia. In 1236, Semigallians attacked crusaders retreating to Riga after the battle of Saule, but by 1254, the Semigallians had been subdued by the Livonian Order. In 1270, the Semigallians joined Lithuanian Grand Duke Traidenis in an attack on Livonia and Saaremaa. During the battle of Karuse, the Livonian Order was defeated, and its master Otto von Lutterberg killed. In 1287, a force of Semigallians attacked a crusader stronghold in Ikšķile and plundered nearby lands. As they returned to Semigallia, they defeated the crusaders at the battle of Garoza, the last such victory. The Semigallians were finally subdued by 1290.

Prussian Crusades. The Prussian Crusades (1222–1274) were a series of 13th-century campaigns of Catholic crusaders, primarily led by the Teutonic Knights, to Christianize the pagan Old Prussians. These include the Crusade of 1222–1223, the First Prussian Uprising of 1242–1249, and the Great Prussian Uprising of 1260–1274.

Lithuanian Crusades. The Lithuanian Crusades (1284–1435) were a series of economic Christian colonization campaigns by the Teutonic Order and the Livonian Order under the religious pretext of forcibly Christianizing the pagan Grand Duchy of Lithuania to Roman Catholicism. (cf. Italian Wikipedia, Crociata lituana)

Crusade of Magnus II Eriksson. The Crusade of Magnus II Eriksson (1347–1351). The Crusade of Magnus II Eriksson of Sweden (Magnus IV of Sweden) against Novgorod began in 1348, when Magnus led a crusade, marching up the Neva, converting the tribes along that river, and briefly capturing the fortress of Orekhov. The Novgorodians retook the fortress in 1349 after a seven-month siege, and Magnus fell back, partially due to the ravages of the plague. He spent much of 1351 unsuccessfully seeking support for further crusading action among the German cities.

Crusades in the Iberian Peninsula

Crusades in the Iberian peninsula, commonly referred to as the Reconquista, from 1031 to 1492.

Timeline. Timeline of the Muslim presence in the Iberian Peninsula.

Granada War. The Granada War (1482–1491) was a series of military campaigns between 1482 and 1491, during the reign of Isabella I of Castile and Ferdinand II of Aragon, against the Emirate of Granada. It ended with the defeat of Granada and its annexation by Castile, ending all Islamic rule on the Iberian peninsula.

Italian Crusades

Crusades against Italian republics and cities, and Sicily. These are documented in the work by British historian Norman Housley, The Italian Crusades: The Papal-Angevin Alliance and the Crusades Against Christian Lay Powers, 1254-1343 (1982).

Mallorca Crusade. The Mallorca Crusade (1113–1115), also known as the Balearic Islands Expedition.

Crusade of John of Brienne in Apulia. The Crusade of John of Brienne in Apulia (1229). Conflicts between John of Brienne and his son-in-law Frederick II in Italy.

Genoese Crusade against Savona and Albenga. The Genoese Crusade against Savona and Albenga (1240). A minor conflict summoned to suppress supporters of Frederick II.

Crusade against Manfred of Sicily. The Crusade against Manfred of Sicily (1255–1266). The first crusade against Manfred of Sicily, the illegitimate son of Frederick II, was preached in 1255. The second was declared after Manfred's coronation as the King of Sicily in 1258. He was excommunicated by Innocent IV and indulgences continued to be enjoyed by those crusaders until his death at the hands of Charles I of Anjou, brother of Louis IX, at the battle of Benevento of 1266.

Crusade against Ezzelino III da Romano. The Crusade against Ezzelino III da Romano (1256). A crusade preached by Innocent IV in Venice against the tyrant Ezzelino III da Romano and his son Alberico da Romano. Innocent had excommunicated the father, who won an initial victory over the crusaders. Wounded in the battle of Cassano d'Adda of 1259, Ezzelino killed himself by self-neglect while imprisoned. The reaction to this crusade left no doubt that crusades against domestic enemies of the Church were every bit as serious as those against Muslims. Ezzelino was a "son of perdition" in Dante's Inferno, his soul consigned to Hell.

Crusade against Conradin. The Crusade against Conradin (1268). Conradin (1252–1268) was nominal king of Jerusalem as the son of Conrad IV of Germany.  He attempted to get control of the Kingdom of Sicily, causing Charles I of Anjou to declare a crusade against him. Conradin joined with Muslim forces at Lucera and was defeated by Charles at Tagliacozzo and later beheaded.

First Crusade against the Arogonese. The Crusade against the Arogonese (1284–1285), also known as the Arogonese Crusade, or Crusade of Aragon, was part of the War of the Sicilian Vespers. The crusade was declared by Martin IV against Peter III of Aragon in 1284 and was conducted by Philip III of France. The crusade effectively ended with a French loss at the battle of the Col de Panissars in 1265. The wars of the Sician Vespers continued until 1302.

Second Crusade against the Arogonese. The Crusade against the Arogonese (1309) was a dispute over the succession of Azzo VIII d'Este, Marquis of Ferrara.

Third Crusade against the Arogonese. The Crusade against the Arogonese (1321–1322). Also known as the Anti-Ghibelline Crusades, these were crusades preached against Matteo I Visconti and his son Galeazzo I Visconti in 1321 and renewed in 1325 against Aldobrandino II d'Este and his son Obizzo III d'Este and supporters in Ferrara. Angevin forces carried out the fighting for these crusades.

Planned crusades

In the 14th century, much work was done to call for a new crusade to recapture Jerusalem. This includes proposals by Benedetto Accolti, Martin Luther's On War Against the Turk, Francis Bacon's Advertisement Touching on a Holy Warre, and Leibnitz' Project de conquête l'Egypte présenté à Louis XIV. In addition, there were other crusades that did not leave the planning stage, including the following.

Crusade of Emperor Henry IV. The Crusade of Emperor Henry IV (1103) was a planned crusade planned by Holy Roman Emperor Henry IV that never materialized.

Crusade of Conrad III. The Crusade of Conrad III (1124) was an expedition by Conrad III of Germany discussed by Ekkehard of Aura in his Chronicon universale.

Crusade Preached against the Mongols in Syria. A Crusade Preached against the Mongols in Syria (1260). After the Mongol takeover of Aleppo in 1260, the Franks in the kingdom called on Alexander IV and Charles I of Anjou for help. The pope issued the bull Audiat orbis calling for a crusade against the Mongols and excommunicating Bohemond VI of Antioch for cooperating with the invaders. The abbot Benedict of Alignan was tasked with organizing the crusade, preaching it in Acre. The defeat of the Mongols at the battle of Ain Jalut in 1260 removed the Mongol threat, at the cost of an increased threat from the Mamluks.

Plans for a Joint Latin-Greek Crusade. Plans for a Joint Latin-Greek Crusade (1274–1276). The Second Council of Lyon in 1274 thwarted Charles I of Anjou's hopes of leading a new crusade. Nevertheless, Gregory X was favorable to a proposal from Michael VIII Palaiologos for a crusade against the Turks to restore the ancient Christian cities of Anatolia. Gregory's death in 1276), put an end to such talks.

Crusade of the Genoese Women. The Crusade of the Genoese Women (1300). Boniface VIII declared 1300 a Jubilee Year, and crusading planning was generated by enthusiasm for the celebration. The women of Genoa intended to go on crusade, to the point of designing and building armored suits.

Crusade of Clement V. The Crusade of Clement V (1309) was a crusade, or passagium generale, against the Mamluks was planned by pope Clement V. The crusade was to be executed by the Knights Hospitaller under Foulques de Villaret, fresh from his successes at Rhodes, and reduced to a passagium. Instead, members of the lower classes of England, France and Germany formed a peasant army, and executed the Crusade of the Poor.

French Plans for Crusade. French Plans for Crusade (1317–1333) were crusades planned for or proposed during the Avignon Papacy, involving three successive kings of France, Philip V, Charles IV and Philip VI.

Crusade of Philip V. The Crusade of Philip V (1317–1322) was a planned crusade by Philip V of France. At the Council of Vienne in 1312, Philip's father Philip IV of France and pope John XXII had agreed to a new crusade. John continued to assure the Armenians that a crusade would soon happen, but instead turned his energies against Ludwig IV of Bavaria and to the Second Shepherds' Crusade.

Crusade of Charles IV. The Crusade of Charles IV (1322–1328) was a planned crusade by Charles IV of France, continuing the interest expressed by his brother Philip V. Charles entrusted his uncle Charles of Valois to negotiate the terms, but conflicts with England took precedence. Nothing ever became of the proposed conflict and the idea died with Charles IV in 1328.

Crusade of Philip VI. The Crusade of Philip VI (1330–1332). An anonymous document Directorium ad passagium faciendum proposed an extensive crusade to Philip VI of France in 1330 or 1332. The proposal was for the conquest of the Holy Land, the Byzantine empire and Russia, In RHC Documents arméniens, Volume 2.IV.

Crusade of Joan of Arc. The Crusade of Joan of Arc (1430). In 1430, Joan of Arc threatened to lead a crusading army against the Hussites unless they returned to the Catholic Church. This followed Martin V's threat to the Hussites and the subsequent Fourth Anti-Hussite Crusade.

Crusade of Pius II. The Crusade of Pius II (1464). At age 60, Pius II took the cross in 1464 and departed for Ancona where he was to meet a small Venetian fleet to attack the Turks. Pius died before the fleet arrived. Nevertheless, a fresco of the pope by Bernardino di Pinturicchio depicts an idealized (and fictional) version of his launching the crusade (Fresco #10, Pope Pius II Arrives in Ancona).

Consolidated list of Crusades 
The consolidated list of the Crusades to the Holy Land from 1095 through 1578 is as follows. For the Reconquista, consult the Timeline of the Muslim presence in the Iberian Peninsula for a more detailed chronology.

Eleventh century

 First Crusade (1095–1099)
 People's Crusade (1096)

Twelfth century

 Crusade of 1101 (1101–1102) (Crusade of the Faint-Hearted)
 Crusade of Emperor Henry IV (1103)
 Crusade of Bohemond of Taranto (1107–1108)
 Norwegian Crusade (1107–1110) (Crusade of Sigurd Jorsalfar)
 Mallorca Crusade (1113–1115) (Balearic Islands Expedition)
 Crusade or Pilgrimage of Fulk V of Anjou (1120–1122)
 Venetian Crusade (1122–1124) (Crusade of Calixtus II)
 Crusade of Conrad III (1124)
 Political Crusade against Roger II of Sicily (1127–1135)
 Crusade of 1129 (Damascus Crusade)
 Second Crusade (1147–1150)
 Wendish Crusade (1147)
 Crusading Project against Byzantium (1149–1150)
 Pilgrimage of Rognvald Kali Kolsson (1151–1153) (Crusade of Rognvald Kali Kolsson)
 Crusader Invasions of Egypt (1154–1169)
 Swedish Crusades (1150s–1293)
 Crusade or Pilgrimage of Henry the Lion (1172)
 Crusade to the East of Philip of Flanders (1177)
 Third Crusade (1189–1192)
 Danish Crusades (1191, 1293)
 Livonian Crusades (1193–1287)
 Crusade of Emperor Henry VI (1197–1198)
 Crusades against Livonians (1198–1209)
 Crusade against Markward von Anweiler (1199)

Thirteenth century

 Fourth Crusade (1202–1204) (Unholy Crusade)
 Crusade against the Bulgars (1205)
 Crusades against the Oeselians (1206–1261)
 Papal Quarrel with John Lackland (1208)
 Conquest of the Estonian Hinderland (1208–1226)
 Albigensian Crusade (1209–1229) (Cathar Crusade)
 Children's Crusade (1212)
 A Political Crusade in England (1215–1217)
 Fifth Crusade (1217–1221)
 Crusade against Semigallians (1219–1290)
 Crusade against Frederick II (1220–1241)
 Prussian Crusades (1222–1274)
 Crusade of William VI of Montferrat (1225)
 Sixth Crusade (1228–1229) (Crusade of Emperor Frederick II)
 Drenthe Crusade (1228–1232)
 Crusade of John of Brienne in Apulia (1229)
 Crusade against the Stedinger (1233–1234) (Stedinger Crusade)
 Bogomils Crusades (1234, 1252)
 Crusades against the Bosnian Heritics (1235, 1241) (Bosnian Crusades)
 Barons' Crusade (1239–1241) (Crusade of 1239)
 Crusade of Theobald I of Navarre (1239–1240)
 Crusade to Tzurulum (1239)
 Crusade of Richard of Cornwall (1240–1241)
 Genoese Crusade against Savona and Albenga (1240)
 Crusade against the Mongols (1241)
 Crusade against Curonians (1242–1267)
 Seventh Crusade (1248–1254) (Crusade of Louis IX of France to the East)
 Pope Innocent IV's Crusade against Frederick II (1248)
 Crusade against Sicily (1248)
 Crusade against Conrad IV (1250)
 First Shepherds’ Crusade (1251)
 Crusade against Manfred of Sicily (1255–1266)
 Crusade against Ezzelino III da Romano (1256)
 Crusade Preached against the Mongols in Syria (1260)
 Anti-Byzantine Crusades (1261–1320)
 Another Political Crusade in England (1263–1265)
 Crusade of Odo of Burgundy (1265–1266)
 Crusade of Charles of Anjou against Lucera (1268)
 Crusade against Conradin, nominal king of Jerusalem (1268)
 Crusade of James I of Aragon (1269–1270)
 Eighth Crusade (1270) (Crusade of Louis IX of France to Tunis)
 Lord Edward's Crusade (1271–1272) (Crusade of Lord Edward of England, the Ninth Crusade, or the Last Crusade)
 Plans for a Joint Latin-Greek Crusade (1274–1276)
 Crusade of Henry of Mecklenburg (1275)
 Lithuanian Crusades (1284–1435)
 Crusade against the Arogonese (1284–1285) (Arogonese Crusade, or Crusade of Aragon)
 Siege of Acre (1291)
 Crusade against Frederick III of Sicily (1298, 1299, 1302).
 Crusade against the Colonna Cardinals (1298)

Fourteenth century

 Expedition of the Almogavars (1301–1311)
 Hospitaller Crusade (1306–1310) (Hospitaller conquest of Rhodes)
 Crusade of the Poor (1309) (Crusade of 1309 or the Shepards' Crusade of 1309)
 Crusade against the Venetians (1309)
 Crusade of Clement V (1309)
Crusade against the Arogonese (1309)
 French Plans for Crusade (1317–1333)
 Crusade of Philip V (1317–1322)
 Second Shepherds' Crusade (1320) (The Pastoreaux of 1320)
 Crusade against Frederico I of Montefeltro (1321–1322)
 Crusade against Ferrara, Milan and the Ghibellines (1321–1322) (Anti-Ghibelline Crusades)
Crusade against the Arogonese (1321–1322)
 Crusade of Charles IV (1322–1328)
 Crusade against the Emperor Louis IV (1328–1329)
 Crusade against the Catalan Grand Company (1330–1332) (Anti-Catalan Crusade)
 Crusade of Philip VI (1330–1332)
 The Naval Crusade of the Holy League (1332–1333)
 The Holy League of Clement VI (1343)
 Smyrniote Crusades (1343–1351)
 Smyrna Crusade (1344)
 Crusade of Humbert II of Viennois (1346)
 Crusade of Magnus II Eriksson (1347–1351)
 Crusade against Francesco Ordelaffi (1355–1357)
 Crusade of Peter I de Lusignan (1362–1365)
 Alexandrian Crusade (1365)
 Crusade of Amadeus VI of Savoy (Savoyard crusade) (1366–1367)
 The Great Schism and the Crusades (1382–1387).
 Crusade against Charles III of Naples (1382)
 Despenser's Crusade (1383) (Norwich Crusade)
 Crusade of John of Gaunt (1387).
 Mahdia Crusade (1390) (Barbary Crusade or Crusade of Louis II de Bourbon against Mahdia)
 Crusade of Nicopolis (1396)
 Crusade of Marshal Boucicaut to Constantinople (1399)

Fifteenth century

 Crusades against the Hussites (1420–1431)
 First Anti-Hussite Crusade (1420)
 Second Anti-Hussite Crusade (1421–1422)
 Third Anti-Hussite Crusade (1423–1424)
 Fourth Anti-Hussite Crusade (1426–1428)
 Crusade of Joan of Arc (1430)
 Fifth Anti-Hussite Crusade (1431)
 Crusade of Varna (1443–1444)
 Crusades to Recover Constantinople (1453–1460)
 Crusade of Nicholas V (1455–1456)
 Genoese Crusade to defend Chios (1455–1457)
 Crusade of St. John of Capistrano (1456) (Siege of Belgrade)
 Occupation of Sporades (1457)
 Crusade of Pius II (1464)
 Siege of Rhodes (1480)
 The Anti-Turkish Crusade (1480–1481)
 Crusade of Otranto (1481)
 Granada War (1482–1491)
 The Waldensian Crusade in the Dauphine (1487–1491)
 Spanish Crusade in North Africa (1499–1510)

Sixteenth century

 Siege of Rhodes (1522)
 Crusade of the Emperor Charles V to Algiers (1541) (Algiers Expedition)
 Spanish Crusade to Mahdia (1550)
 Crusade of King Sebastian of Portugal to Morocco (1578) (Battle of Alcácer Quibir or the Battle of Three Kings)

Source material 
 Chronology and Maps, in The Oxford History of the Crusades (1995), edited by Jonathan Riley-Smith.
 A Chronological Outline of the Crusades: Background, Military Expeditions, and Crusader States, in The Routledge Companion to the Crusades (2006), by historian Peter Lock.
 A Narrative Outline of the Crusade, ibid.
 The Crusades: A Chronology, in The Crusades—An Encyclopedia (2006), edited by Alan V. Murray.
 Important Dates and Events, 1049–1571, in History of the Crusades, Volume III, edited by Kenneth M. Setton (1975).
 God's War: A New Introduction to the Crusades (2006), by Christopher Tyerman.

See also 

 Crusader States
 European wars of religion
 List of sources for the Crusades

References 

 
Medieval history of the Middle East